Nana, Nanna, Na Na or NANA may refer to:

People and fictional characters 
 Nana (given name), including a list of people and characters with the given name
 Nana (surname), including a list of people and characters with the surname
 Nana (chief) (died 1896), Mimbreño Apache chief
 Nana (deejay) (born 1983), Malaysian Akademi Fantasia contestant
 Nana (entertainer) (born 1991), a member of popular South Korean girl group After School
 Nana (rapper) (born 1968), German rapper and DJ
 Nana Astar Deviluke, a character in the manga series To Love Ru
 Nana, a member of the South Korean girl group Woo!ah!
 Nana, female UK garage singer, most notably on the song "Body Groove" by Architechs
 Lulu and Nana (born 2018),  pseudonyms for twin Chinese girls, who are allegedly the first humans produced from embryos that were genome-edited
 Nana, name used for the Ngaanyatjarra people of Western Australia

Arts and entertainment

Films  
 Nana (1926 film), a French film by Jean Renoir
 Nana (1934 film), an American film by Dorothy Arzner and George Fitzmaurice
 Nana (1944 film), a Mexican film by Celestino Gorostiza and Roberto Gavaldón starring Lupe Velez
 Nana (1955 film), a French-Italian film by Christian-Jaque
 Nana (1970 film), starring Gillian Hills
 Nana, the original title of Nana, the True Key of Pleasure, a 1982 Italian film by Dan Wolman
 Nana (1985 film), a  Mexican film by Rafael Baledón starring Irma Serrano and Verónica Castro
 Nana (1997 film), a Palestinian documentary film
 Nanà (2001 film), by Alberto Negrin
 Nana (2005 film), based on the manga by Ai Yazawa
 Nana (2007 short film), by Warwick Thornton
 La Nana, Spanish name for The Maid (2009 film) by Chilean Sebastián Silva
 Nana: A Tale of Us, a 2017 film by Tiakümzük Aier

Music 
 Nana (opera), 1930s opera by Manfred Gurlitt
 NaNa (band), a Japanese duo formed in 1996
 Na Na (boy band), a Russian band
 Nana (album), the 1996 debut album of German rapper Nana
 Nana (echos), a concept in Byzantine music
 "Na Na" (song), a 2014 song by Trey Songz
 "NaNa", a song by Blaaze
 "NaNa", a 2013 song from the album Acid Rap by Chance the Rapper and Action Bronson
 "Nana", a 1986 single by The Checkers (Japanese band)
 "Nana", a composition by Federico Moreno Torroba

Television
 Nana (1981 miniseries), a French television miniseries with Véronique Genest
 Nana (1987 television series), a Danish television series for children
 Nana (1995 television film), a film starring Bernadette Heerwagen
 "The Nana", an episode of the television show The O.C. (season 1)

Other uses in arts and entertainment
 Nana (novel), by Émile Zola
 Nana (Manet), a painting by Édouard Manet
 Nana (manga), by Ai Yazawa

Places 
 Nana, Rajasthan, India, a village
 Nana, Călărași, Romania, a commune
 Nána, Slovakia, a village and municipality
 Nana, Bangkok, Thailand, an intersection and neighborhood in Bangkok
 Soi Nana (Chinatown), an alley in the Chinatown area of Bangkok
 Nana BTS station, a BTS skytrain station in Bangkok

Religion and mythology 
 Nana (Greek mythology), a Phrygian demigoddess and the mother of Attis
 Nana (Kushan goddess), a Bactrian war goddess
 Nane (goddess), also found as Nana, the Armenian goddess of war, wisdom, and motherhood
 Nana Buluku, the supreme goddess of the Fon people of Benin
 Jnana, also spelled ñana, the concept of knowledge in Hinduism and Buddhism
 Nanaya, also transcribed as Nanâ, a goddess worshipped by the Sumerians and Akkadians

Science and technology
 Nana (C++ library), a cross-platform library for graphical user interfaces
 N-Acetylneuraminic acid, abbreviated NANA
 Nana technology, microchip-based technology designed to benefit older adults

Other uses 
 Nana, another name for grandmother
 Nana (title), an Akan chieftaincy title in Ghana
 Hurricane Nana, three hurricanes
 North American Newspaper Alliance (NANA), a large newspaper syndicate from 1922 to 1980
 NANA Regional Corporation, a for-profit Alaska Native Regional Corporation
 NANA Development Corporation, owned by the above
 Nanadjara, or the Nana, an indigenous Australian group

See also 

 Nana mint, a common name for Mentha spicata 'Nana', a spearmint cultivar grown in Morocco
 Nana-berry, a common name for Rhus dentata, a deciduous tree species
 Nana 10, an Israeli web portal
 Nan (disambiguation)
 Nanas (disambiguation)
 Nanna (disambiguation)
 Nanny (disambiguation)
 Nanum (disambiguation)
 Nanus (disambiguation)